Princeton Community High School is a four-year comprehensive secondary school in Princeton, Indiana.  The high school is a part of the North Gibson School Corporation.  Until March 2016, the school operated a television station, W06BD, from studios at the high school. Princeton Community is the second largest of the three high schools serving Gibson County, Indiana. The others are Gibson Southern, which is larger, and Wood Memorial, which is smaller.

History
Princeton Community High School was opened in the early 1970s to replace old Princeton High School, which became crowded due to the public school consolidations of the previous few decades.

A new High School opened in August 2012. Princeton Community Middle School is now located in the former Princeton Community High School resulting in a centralized Middle-High School Campus.

Princeton's principals 
 Amy Stough (2018–present)
 Steve Hauger (2014 - 2018)
 Jon Abbey (2002–2014)
 James E. Isaacs (1994-2002)
 Lawrence Ramsey (1970-1994)

Athletics
Sports offered at PCHS are:

boys' baseball
boys' and girls' basketball
cheerleading
boys' and girls' cross country
boys' football
boys' and girls' golf
boys' and girls' soccer
girls' softball
boys' and girls' tennis
boys and girls' track
girls' volleyball
boys' wrestling

The boys' basketball team took the 3A state title in the 2008-2009 season.

The girls' basketball team also won the 3A state title in the 2014-2015 season.

Notable people
 Gary Denbo - baseball coach and executive
 Jackie Young - American basketball player, chosen first for the 2019 WNBA Las Vegas Aces team

See also
 List of high schools in Indiana

References

External links
School website
North Gibson School Corporation website
DOE Mustang profile

High schools in Southwestern Indiana
Public high schools in Indiana
Princeton, Indiana
Big Eight Conference (IHSAA)
Former Southern Indiana Athletic Conference members
Schools in Gibson County, Indiana
1970 establishments in Indiana